Douglas Fitzgerald Dowd (December 7, 1919 – September 8, 2017) was an American political economist, economic historian and political activist.

Academic career

From the late 1940s to the late 1990s, Dowd taught at Cornell University, the University of California, Berkeley and other universities. He has authored books that criticize capitalism in general, and US capitalism in particular.

He was awarded a Guggenheim Fellowship in the field of economic history for the academic year 1959–1960.

Many of his writings and audio transcripts are available on his website.

Personal life

Dowd was the son of a Jewish mother and a Catholic father. The strong dislike for each side of the family for the other side led him during his youth to embrace an antireligious attitude.

Dowd claimed to be "non-religious" without saying if he was an agnostic or atheist.

Politics

Dowd was one of the nominees of the Peace and Freedom Party for Vice President in the 1968 US presidential election. He agreed to be on the ticket in New York in order to prevent the selection of Jerry Rubin. The party's presidential candidate that year was Black Panther Eldridge Cleaver, who finished a distant fifth in the election.

Dowd was a sponsor of the War Tax Resistance project, which practiced and advocated tax resistance as a form of protest against the Vietnam War.

Dowd was the faculty sponsor of the West Tennessee Voters Project in Fayette County, Tennessee, that inspired a sizable number of Cornell students to become more active in civil rights work in the South one year after the gruesome murder of Andrew Goodman, Michael Schwerner and James Chaney in Philadelphia, Mississippi.

Bibliography
 Step by step (1965)
 Modern Economic Problems in Historical Perspective (1965)
 Thorstein Veblen: A Critical Reappraisal; Lectures and Essays Commemorating the Hundredth Anniversary of Veblen's Birth (1965)
 America's role in the world economy:the challenge to orthodoxy (1966)
 The Twisted Dream: Capitalist Development in the United States Since 1776 (1974)  2nd edition (1977)
 Waste of Nations: Dysfunction in the World Economy (1989) 
 U.S. Capitalist Development Since 1776: Of, By, and for Which People? (1993)
 Blues for America: A Critique, a Lament, and Some Memories (1997) 
 Against the Conventional Wisdom: A Primer for Current Economics Controversies and Proposals (1997) 
 Capitalism and Its Economics: A Critical History (2000) 
 Understanding Capitalism: Critical Analysis from Karl Marx to Amartya Sen (2002) 
 At the Cliffs Edge: World Problems and U.S. Power (Peninsula Peace and Justice Center, 2007)
 Inequality and the Global Economic Crisis (2009)

Footnotes

External links
 Official site of Doug Dowd

1919 births
2017 deaths
American economists
American economics writers
American male non-fiction writers
American military personnel of World War II
American tax resisters
Economic historians
Jewish American social scientists
Peace and Freedom Party vice presidential nominees
1968 United States vice-presidential candidates
University of California, Berkeley faculty
Cornell University faculty
21st-century American Jews